The 2011 Salford City Council election took place on 5 May 2011 to elect members of Salford City Council in England. This was on the same day as other local elections.

Salford local elections are organised 'in thirds', with Councillors elected in 2007 defending their seats in 2011, with vote share changes calculated on that basis.

One third of the council was up for election. The Labour Party gained five seats and remains in overall control of the council. The results mirrored those of the 2010 elections with Labour winning the same seventeen wards and the Conservatives three wards.

The composition of the Council following the 2011 elections is:

Ward results
Asterisks denote incumbent Councillors seeking re-election.
Vote share changes compared with corresponding 2007 election.

Barton ward

Boothstown And Ellenbrook ward

Broughton ward

Cadishead ward

Claremont ward

Eccles ward

Irlam ward

Irwell Riverside ward

Kersal ward

Langworthy ward

Little Hulton ward

Ordsall ward

Pendlebury ward

Swinton North ward

Swinton South ward

Walkden North ward

Walkden South ward

Weaste & Seedley ward

Winton ward

Worsley ward

References

2011
2011 English local elections
2010s in Greater Manchester